The Most Beautiful Girl in the World  is a 2018 German comedy/romance film directed by Aron Lehmann. It takes the play Cyrano de Bergerac into the 21st century.

Synopsis 
The story is about a girl, Roxy, who moves to a new school. Here she makes friends with Cyril who is an outcast throughout school, he starts to fall in love with her but is too afraid to mention it so he expresses his feelings through Rick.

Music 
Cyril writes music to Roxy throughout the movie and some of these have gained popularity, such as the song 'Immer wehn wir uns sehn' meaning 'Whenever we see each other' which was written with song artist Lea. The song managed to make it into the German single charts.

Cast 
  as Cyril
  as Rick
 Luna Wedler as Roxy
  as Benno
 Heike Makatsch as Frau Reimann
 Anke Engelke as Cyrils Mutter
  as Marc
 Sinje Irslinger as Lissi
 Julia Beautx as Titti

References

External links 

2018 films
2018 comedy films
German comedy films
Films based on Cyrano de Bergerac (play)
2010s German films
2010s German-language films